Cepi may refer to:

 Čepí, a village in the Pardubice Region of the Czech Republic. 
 Coalition for Epidemic Preparedness Innovations, a Norway-based foundation that finances vaccine development
 Confederation of European Paper Industries, a pan-European association representing the forest fibre and paper industry
 Frank Cepollina, American engineer
 Centre for Education Policy of India, a think tank on higher education 
 Çepi, Karayazı, Turkey, a neighbourhood